The Centro Ocidental Rio-Grandense is one of the seven mesoregions of the state of Rio Grande do Sul in Brazil. It consists of 31 municipalities, grouped in three microregions: 
 Restinga Seca
 Santa Maria
 Santiago

References

Mesoregions of Rio Grande do Sul